Algernon Findlay (17 March 1892 – 9 January 1956) was an Australian cricketer. He played seven first-class matches for Tasmania between 1913 and 1931.

See also
 List of Tasmanian representative cricketers

References

External links
 

1892 births
1956 deaths
Australian cricketers
Tasmania cricketers
Cricketers from Launceston, Tasmania